Romulus Zachariah Linney (December 26, 1841 – April 15, 1910) was an American politician who was a Republican U.S. Congressman from North Carolina between 1895 and 1901.

Life and career
Linney was born in Rutherford County, North Carolina, the son of Martha (née Baxter) and William Coplin Linney. He attended common schools, York's Collegiate Institute, and Doctor Millen's School in Taylorsville, North Carolina. During the American Civil War, he served in the Confederate Army of Northern Virginia as a private in Company A of the 7th North Carolina Infantry. He was seriously wounded at the Battle of Chancellorsville.

After the war, he engaged in agricultural pursuits and studied law. Admitted to the bar in 1868, he opened a practice in Taylorsville. He was elected to the North Carolina Senate in 1870, 1873, and 1882 and then to the United States Congress in 1894, serving three terms in the 44th, 45th, and 46th Congresses (March 4, 1895 – March 3, 1901). While in the North Carolina Senate, Linney was a major proponent of the construction of the Alexander Railroad, then known as the Statesville & Western Railroad.

Linney died in Taylorsville in 1910 and is buried in the Taylorsville Cemetery.  He is the great-grandfather of playwright Romulus Linney and great-great-grandfather of actress Laura Linney.

References

External links

1841 births
1910 deaths
People from Rutherford County, North Carolina
Republican Party North Carolina state senators
Confederate States Army soldiers
North Carolina lawyers
Republican Party members of the United States House of Representatives from North Carolina
19th-century American politicians
People from Taylorsville, North Carolina
Linney family
19th-century American lawyers